Gancedo  is a village and municipality in Chaco Province in northern Argentina.

In September 2016, a huge meteorite – the second largest ever found – was exhumed near the town. It weighed 30 tonnes and fell to Earth around 2000 BC.

References

Populated places in Chaco Province